Dig Yourself Deep is a 2007 studio album by The Undertones. It is the band's second album with lead singer Paul McLoone, who replaced Feargal Sharkey when the band reformed in November 1999.

The track "Here Comes The Rain" has been played during live performances since 2005 including the band's appearance at the Glastonbury Festival in that year.

Tracks from this album and predecessor Get What You Need were remastered for the compilation Dig What You Need in 2022.

Track listing

Personnel
The Undertones
 Paul McLoone - lead vocals
 John O'Neill - guitar, backing vocals
 Damian O'Neill - guitar, keyboards, backing vocals
 Michael Bradley - bass, backing vocals
 Billy Doherty - drums

References

External links
Official website www.digyourselfdeep.com

2003 albums
The Undertones albums
Cooking Vinyl albums